Leon Rayon Johnson (born 8 August 1987 in Georgetown, Demerara), is a Guyanese born West Indies cricketer who captained the West Indies in the 2006 U-19 Cricket World Cup in Sri Lanka.

Domestic career

Johnson made his first class debut for Guyana in the 2003/04 season when he played in two first class matches, scoring just four runs from 3 innings. He did not feature in Guyana's first-class team for the next three seasons. He made his list A debut in the 2007/08 season.

In the 2007/08 domestic season, Johnson scored 427 runs at an average of 42.70 from 6 matches for Guyana in the Carib Beer Series. He fell six runs short of his maiden first-class century on 7 March 2008 when he edged a wide delivery from off-spinner Shirley Clarke against Combined Campuses and Colleges. The innings was his highest score of the season.

Johnson was the leading run-scorer in the 2015–16 Regional Four Day Competition, scoring 807 runs from ten matches.

In October 2018, in the first semi-final match of the 2018–19 Regional Super50, Johnson scored his first century in List A cricket, helping Guyana to beat Jamaica by one wicket and progress to the final. In October 2019, he was named as the captain of Guyana's squad for the 2019–20 Regional Super50 tournament. In February 2020, in the 2019–20 West Indies Championship, Johnson scored his 6,000 run in first-class cricket.

International career

Before representing the West Indies at senior level, Johnson was part of the West Indies under-19 team and played in seven youth One Day Internationals. he scored 30 runs at an average of 30.00 with a high score of 29* and took nine wickets at 27.44 with his slow bowling with best bowling figures of 3/24. Johnson captained the under-19 side at the 2006 under-19 World Cup; amongst his performances was an innings of 83 against South Africa to help his team secure a place in the next round of the competition.

Consistent performances in the Carib Beer Series led to Johnson's selection for the tri-series involving Bermuda and Canada. He made his international debut – along with Brendan Nash and Kemar Roach – in a One Day International match against Bermuda. Johnson scored 27 runs off 28 balls before being caught out off the spin bowling of Delyone Borden as the West Indies won by six wickets. Johnson scored his first ODI half century on 22 August 2008. He scored 51 off 77 balls in a 128-run stand with Xavier Marshall who in the same innings broke the record for number of sixes hit in an ODI as West Indies beat Canada by 49 runs. In the final against Canada, Johnson was out to debutant Balaji Rao for one run from nine balls as the West Indies won by seven wickets.

In November 2008, the ODI squad to tour Pakistan was announced, with Johnson as one of the members. John Dyson, the West Indies coach, stated that Johnson's performance against Canada and Bermuda had shown he was ready to perform against leading cricket teams such as Pakistan. On the same day, it was announced that Johnson was one of four players – along with Lionel Baker, Brendan Nash, and Kemar Roach – without a Test cap to be named in the 15-man squad selected to tour New Zealand for a Test series. However, Johnson did not play in the series.

He made his Test debut in September 2014 against Bangladesh at Beausejour Stadium in Gros Islet where he scored 66 in the first innings and then 41 runs in second.

References

External links
CricketArchive stats
Cricinfo player profile

1987 births
Living people
Guyanese cricketers
West Indies Test cricketers
West Indies One Day International cricketers
Guyana Amazon Warriors cricketers
Guyana cricketers
Sportspeople from Georgetown, Guyana